SZA (born Solána Imani Rowe; 1990) is an American R&B singer.

SZA may also refer to:

 Schizoaffective disorder, a psychiatric diagnosis with symptoms of a mood disorder and schizophrenia
 Solar zenith angle, in astronomy and earth science
 Soyo Airport, in Angola (IATA airport code SZA)
 Sunyaev–Zel'dovich Array, an array of telescopes
 sza, the ISO 639 code for the Semelai language of Malaysia

See also
 Scissor (disambiguation)